Black Ink Crew is an American reality television series that began airing on January 7, 2013, and airs on VH1. It chronicles the daily operations and staff drama at an African American-owned and operated tattoo shop in the Harlem neighborhood of New York City.

Series overview

Episodes

Season 1 (2013)

Season 2 (2013–14)

Season 3 (2015)

Season 4 (2016)

Season 5 (2017)

Season 6 (2017–18)

Season 7 (2018–19)

Season 8 (2019–20)

Season 9 (2021–22)

Season 10 (2022)

References

External links 
 

Black Ink Crew episodes